Khederabad (also Romanized as Khederābād) is a village in Jafarabad Rural District, Jafarabad District, Qom County, Qom Province, Iran. At the 2006 census, its population was 73, in 19 families.

References 

Populated places in Qom Province